Owen Smith (born March 6, 2000) is an American professional stock car racing driver.

Racing career
Smith's interest in racing began when he was in sixth grade, during which his father brought him to Southside Speedway. He made his racing debut at the age of 13 at Shenandoah Speedway. In 2016, he started competing in the NASCAR Whelen All-American Series and finished in the top 500 in the national standings. He repeated the placement from 2017 to 2019.

As a student at the University of Northwestern Ohio, Smith joined the Over the Wall Club which allowed him to connect with those within the racing industry. In 2019, he became a crewman for Fast Track Racing and worked on the pit crew for driver Tommy Vigh Jr. In July, he began driving for the team beginning at Toledo Speedway, where he exited after completing five laps with electrical issues. As a start and park entry, he also worked as a crew chief for his own car.

In 2021, he replaced Brad Smith (of no relation) in the No. 48 for the season opener at Daytona International Speedway after Brad suffered retinal detachment while chipping ice.

Personal life
Smith graduated from Louisa County High School in 2018.

Motorsports career results

ARCA Menards Series
(key) (Bold – Pole position awarded by qualifying time. Italics – Pole position earned by points standings or practice time. * – Most laps led.)

References

External links
 
 ARCA bio
 

2000 births
Living people
ARCA Menards Series drivers
NASCAR drivers
Racing drivers from Virginia